Metro AG is a German multinational company based in Düsseldorf which operates business membership only cash and carry stores primarily under the Metro brand. Until 2020 it was also active in general retail business through Real division, which was sold to an investor consortium.

Unlike American warehouse clubs such as Costco or Sam's Club, it is not possible for private customers to acquire a membership for most Metro locations. As of September 2022 it operates around 661 stores in 31 countries in Europe and Asia.

The company was established in 1964 by Ernst Schmidt and Wilhelm Schmidt-Ruthenbeck. In 2010, it was the fourth-largest retailer in the world measured by revenues, after  Wal-Mart, Carrefour and Tesco. Its current incarnation was launched in 2017 as a spun-off of old Metro AG, which continued to be a consumer electronics retailer and renamed itself Ceconomy.

History

The history of the Metro began on 8 November 1963 in Essen with the opening of the first wholesale center under the name Metro by the brothers Ernst Schmidt and Wilhelm Schmidt-Ruthenbeck. Planning and opening of the first hypermarket under the name Metro in Essen was the responsibility of Walter Vieth, who was managing director there from 1963 to 1970.

In 1964, a year after the opening of the first Metro store, the Stöcker & Reinshagen company (the Schell family) planned a cash and carry store in Mülheim an der Ruhr. During the construction phase, the businessmens Schmidt-Ruthenbeck, Schmidt and Schell met and decided to merge their cash and carry activities. So they founded Metro-SB-Großmarkt GmbH & Co. KG with headquarters in Mülheim, later in Düsseldorf. Otto Beisheim, until 1964 authorized signatory of the company Stöcker & Reinshagen, became the sole managing director. In 1966, the third Metro was opened in West Berlin.

In 1966, Otto Beisheim met Friedrich Wilhelm Lenz, Chairman of the Management Board of Franz Haniel & Cie. and was able to convince him into investing in Metro. In the course of the following reorganization Beisheim became a shareholder himself. From this point on, the founding family Schmidt-Ruthenbeck and the shareholders Beisheim and Haniel each held about one third of the shares.

Under the sole leadership of Otto Beisheim, a rapid and very successful expansion of the Metro stores into the greater German and European area began in 1967 with the opening of the Metro stores in Godorf near Cologne, Hamburg, Munich and, after a connection with the Dutch company SHV Holdings, the first C&C wholesale store (brand: Makro) in the Netherlands, and in 1968 in Düsseldorf.

In 1980, Metro took over 24.9 percent of Kaufhof.

In March 1996, Metro AG was formed by the merger of Metro Cash & Carry with Kaufhof Holding AG, Deutsche SB-Kauf AG (of the insolvent company co op AG), and Asko Deutsche Kaufhaus AG (emerged from Allgemeine Saar Konsum, in which a Metro investment company had previously held shares). The group also included the Huma shopping centers, the sports retail stores Primus Sportwelt, MHB Handel AG and the office supplies and stationery manufacturer Pelikan, as well as Media-Saturn, the consumer electronics business of Media Markt and Saturn. The share of Metro AG was founded retrospectively on January 1 and listed on 22 July 1996 on the Frankfurt Stock Exchange and was part of the DAX until 2012.

In 1998, the computer retailers Vobis and Maxdata, the Adler fashion stores and Reno's shoe retailers, the discounter TiP, Möbel Roller and unprofitable Kaufhof branches were brought into the subsidiary Divaco, which was founded together with Deutsche Bank and the Gerling Group, in order to attract new buyers.  In December 2003, Metro separated from its stake in Divaco KG and sold its shares to the sole shareholder and CEO, Siegfried Kaske, for 1 euro. In 2004, Metro bought Adler fashion stores back from Divaco.

Also in 1998, the 94 Allkauf -S department stores were bought, as was Allkauf Touristik Vertriebs GmbH with 160 travel agencies, which were sold again by Metro.

In 2005, Metro split off the Praktiker home improvement division, which went public as an independent company.

In July 2006 Metro bought the 85 German stores of Wal-Mart, which gave up its loss-making Germany business. The Wal-Mart stores were largely integrated into the Real sales brand.

In July 2008, the Extra supermarket chain with around 250 locations and sales of around 1.6 billion euro, was sold to the Rewe Group. Metro sold the Adler fashion stores to the associated company BluO in February 2009.

In October 2012, Makro-Habib in Pakistan became Metro-Habib.

In November 2012, Metro sold its 91 Real hypermarkets in Poland, Romania, Russia and Ukraine to Auchan for 1.1 billion euro.

In 2014 Metro sold the 12 hypermarkets in Turkey.

In 2017 Metro sold the last remaining four hypermarkets in Romania.

On 15 June 2015, Metro AG agreed to sell Galeria Kaufhof to Canadian retail conglomerate Hudson's Bay Company for $3.2 billion.

On 30 March 2016, Metro Group announced that it will be splitting into two independent companies: A spin-off of the wholesale and food sector of Metro AG will be responsible for the group divisions into two independent and publicly listed companies. Both will have their own management, supervisory board and independent company profiles. Metro AG was renamed Ceconomy, comprising Media Markt and Saturn electronics stores, while a new company with the name Metro AG was formed, comprising Metro Cash & Carry and Real.

In September 2018, Metro announced that it wanted to sell the Real hypermarket subsidiary in Germany to focus entirely on wholesale business. In February 2020, Real was sold to the German-Russian consortium of X-Bricks and SCP Group. The deal was completed in June 2020.

Controversies 
Following the 2022 Russian invasion of Ukraine which began on February 24, many international, particularly Western companies pulled out of Russia. Unlike most of its Western competitors, Metro AG announced its intention to keep its business in Russia open, drawing criticism. Ukrainian government officials have called for a global boycott of the company.  The Ukrainian office of MetroAG has allegedly been threatened by the company's headquarters in Germany due to the Ukrainian branch openly calling for sanctions on Metro's Russian branch. According to Ukrainian ex-minister Dmytro Dubilet the Ukrainian branch has received warnings to be disconnected from the centralized supply. In February 2023, the National Agency for the Prevention of Corruption of Ukraine included the company in the list of international war sponsors.

Wholesale operations

The company operates wholesale stores, primarily under the Metro brand, in Europe, India, Kazahstan and Pakistan. In Belgium, Netherlands, Poland, Portugal, Spain, and Czech Republic, it operates stores under the Makro brand, which were acquired entirely from SHV Holdings in 1998.

Belgium is the only country where non-business membership stores are operated, with 6 branches under the Makro brand. There are also 10 Metro stores for business members. They closed all Makro store on 31 December 2022, Metro Store were sold to Sligro.

, Metro is operating 674 wholesale stores in 24 countries.

Former Wholesale Operations

Denmark
Metro opened the first store in 1971 in the Copenhagen suburb of Glostrup. Since then stores have been opened in Aarhus, Kolding, Sydhavnen in Copenhagen and Aalborg in chronological order. Denmark was one of the first countries to begin operating delivery services out of the stores and had its own truck fleet that covered all of Denmark. Metro left Denmark in December 2014.

United Kingdom
In 2012, Metro sold its 30 Makro stores in United Kingdom to Booker Group.

Greece
In 2014, Metro sold the Makro Greek business, composed of 9 stores, to Sklavenitis.

Egypt
The first store opened in June 2010 and the second in October 2010. Both stores were closed some time within 2013-2015, as the company started withdrawing from loss-making markets.

Morocco
In 2010, Metro sold the Makro subsidiary in Morocco.

Vietnam
In 2014, Metro Group signed an agreement to sell its subsidiary in Vietnam, consisting of 19 stores, to the Thai group Berli Jucker worth €665 million.

China
The first store in China was opened in 1996 in Shanghai in a joint-venture with the Jinjiang Group. On 23 April 2020, Metro completed the sale of the majority stake in Metro China, who operates 97 wholesale centers, to Wumei Technology Group for more than €1.5 billion. Metro’s 20% stake in the joint venture allows it to explore various strategic partnership opportunities with Wumei and its technology partner Dmall.

Japan
In August 2021, METRO decided to wind-down its Cash & Carry wholesale operations in Japan by the end of October, operations were ceased with all 10 wholesale stores closed down.

Myanmar
In September 2021, Metro announced it would end its supply business in Myanmar by the end of October 2021.

Belgium
In 2022, Metro sold its Belgian branch including 11 Metro and 6 Makro stores.

Metro name
Metro had the naming rights for brand name Metro protected at an early stage, including an agreement with the Hollywood giant Metro-Goldwyn-Mayer, which was possible at the time without remuneration.

Metro tried to secure its usage rights for the term "Metro" in various proceedings. The Lower Saxony railway company MetroRail had to change its name to Metronom Eisenbahngesellschaft mbH, but can still call its trains Metro. Also the Metro Rapid Successors Metro Express was renamed after being threatened with legal action. In Nabburg (Upper Palatinate), the Metro discotheque was sued and had to change its name. Lawsuits against public transport companies Berliner Verkehrsbetriebe (BVG), Hamburger Hochbahn (HHA), Hamburger Verkehrsverbund  (HVV) and Munich Transport Company (MVG) because of the name Metro-Bus for some main bus routes were rejected in the first instance. The second instance confirmed the judgments, but significantly restricted the use of the public transport companies of the name Metro. In the Ruhr area, the bike rental system Metrorad ruhr had to be renamed Metropolradruhr.

In 2012, in the face of an impending brand conflict, Microsoft renamed its Metro user interface of the Microsoft Windows 8 computer operating system.

See also

 European Retail Round Table

References

External links

 Metro wholesale

Retail companies established in 1964
Retail companies of Germany
Companies based in Düsseldorf
Multinational companies headquartered in Germany
Supermarkets of Germany
Wholesalers of Germany
 
German companies established in 1964
Companies in the MDAX